Irma Kurtz (born September 3, 1935) is an American-born UK-based writer and agony aunt. She has worked in that capacity for Cosmopolitan magazine for over 40 years. She lives in London's King’s Cross.

Early life
Kurtz was born in New Jersey in 1935, and grew up in Jersey City, New Jersey, and spent time in New York City growing up. Her father was a dentist. She has a bachelor's degree in English literature from Columbia University.

Career

Journalism
After university, Kurtz undertook the Study Abroad program traveling to Europe in 1954 as an 18-year-old on the Castel Felice, an episode she recounts in Then Again : Travels in Search of My Younger Self. She returned and worked as a journalist, travelling in Europe and living in Paris, before settling in London. She worked for Nova magazine from its beginning in 1965, and joined Cosmopolitan in the United Kingdom in 1972. Kurtz also wrote for the American edition for 10 years.

Kurtz has written three self-help books, two novels and three travel books.

Television
Kurtz was the writer and presenter of Mediterranean Tales, a 10-part series for BBC4.

Bibliography
 Grand Dragon (1981)
 Loneliness (1983)
 Beds of Nails and Roses (1983)
 The Great American Bus Ride (1993)
 Dear London (1998)
 My Life in Agony: Confessions of a Professional Agony Aunt (2014)

Personal life
She has a son, Marc, a television director, who is married with four children.

References

1935 births
Living people
20th-century American non-fiction writers
21st-century American non-fiction writers
20th-century American women writers
21st-century American women writers
American advice columnists
Jewish advice columnists
American women columnists
Jewish American journalists
American women journalists
Writers from London
Writers from Jersey City, New Jersey
21st-century American Jews